runs parallel to the west bank of the Kamo River on the eastern side of Kyoto, Japan. Its intersection with Shijō Street is called Shijō Kawaramachi and is a leading shopping district of the city.

Both Shijō and Kawaramachi Street are protected with smoking bans.

Overview

Edo Period 
Located outside of Heian-kyō and runs almost parallel to Toyotomi Hideyoshi's Odoi. It is thought that it was established when the city expanded to the Kamo River in the early Edo Period.

From north to south it extends from Aoibashi Nishizume to Jujō Street. North of Aoibashi Nishizume its name changes to Shimogamo Main Street. South of Jujō Street it curves along the Kamo River and joins with Kuzebashi Street. The stretch between Sanjō Street and Shijō Street is one of Kyoto's downtown shopping streets.

Because the portion between Shijō Street and Kamijuzuyacho Street runs parallel to the Kamo River bending  in a North-North-East and South-South-West direction it naturally intersects with north–south running Teramachi Street and Gokomachi Street.

History 
It is not clear when the excavation began of the eastern end of Heikan-kyo and inner eastern side of Odoi but because Odoi was runs along Kawaramachi Street's western side it is thought to be after the creation of Kawaramachi.

Points of Interest 

 Kitamura Museum
 Kyoto Prefectural Centre for Arts and Culture
 Honzen-ji
 Shōjōkeiin
 Rozan-ji
 Kyoto Prefectural University of Medicine
 Bank of Japan Kyoto Branch
 Kyoto City Office
 Zesuto-Oike (Underground shopping street)
 Kyoto Hotel Okura
 Kyoto Shiyakusho-mae Station of Kyoto Municipal Subway Tōzai Line
 Honnō-ji
 Mina Kyoto
 Takashimaya Kyoto Branch
 KYOTO MARUI
 Kyoto-kawaramachi Station of Hankyu Kyoto Main Line
 Hito-machi Cultural Exchange Centre
 Shōsei-en Garden

Streets in Kyoto